Platymacha is a monotypic moth genus in the family Gelechiidae. Its only species, Platymacha anthochroa, is found on New Guinea. Both the genus and species were first described by Edward Meyrick in 1933.

References

Gelechiinae